Live at Montreux 1986 is a concert film featuring the British blues rock guitarist and singer Eric Clapton. The video release consists of live footage that was recorded while Eric Clapton and his band played for over one and a half hours at the 1986 Montreux Jazz Festival. The set list includes Clapton's signature songs such as "I Shot the Sheriff," "Cocaine," "Layla" and "Let It Rain" as well as his Cream-era hits "Crossroads," "White Room," "Badge" and "Sunshine of Your Love." Drummer Phil Collins also sang his 1981 hit "In the Air Tonight." The video taping was released on 19 September 2006 on DVD format. A Blu-ray disc was also released in 2014. The release was mildly successful and it gained critical praise and various music recording certification awards around the world.

Background
The concert film features Eric Clapton and his friends as the house band, playing a set list of  one hour and fifty minutes at the 1986 Montreux Jazz Festival, which was held at the Montreux Casino on 10 July 1986. The DVD video was released on 19 September 2006, whereas the Blu-ray disc was released eight years later. Eric Clapton's friends who formed the band consist of Nathan East on bass guitar, Phil Collins on drums, and Greg Phillinganes on the keyboard.

Track listing

But 2 songs are missing: Have You Ever Loved a Woman and Ramblin' on My Mind.

Critical reception
Music critic Linus Schwanke calls the release "in every way a highlight." He goes positively on in his review, noting Live at Montreux 1986 is a "huge enjoyment for ears and eyes" and "this is how perfect blues-rock should be written, recorded and played." Olaf Oetken of Rocktimes online magazine notes the release features "important music of one of the world's most important and best guitar players." Oetken also calls the video release "one of Eric Clapton's best concerts". Allmusic did not rate the release yet.

Personnel

Main personnel
Eric Clapton – Guitar · lead vocals
Nathan East – Bass guitar · backing vocals
Phil Collins – Drums · backing vocals
Greg Phillinganes – Keyboards · backing vocals

Production crew
Thierry Amsallem – Director
Andree Buchler – Post production
Eric Glardon – Post producer

Keith Haring – Poster designer
Michael Heatley – Liner Notes writer
Claire Higgins – Production coordination
Rosie Holley – Associate producer
Geoff Kempin – Executive producer
Claude Nobs – Executive producer
Jean Ristori – Post producer · post production
Melissa Roy – Associate producer
Terry Shand – Executive producer
Abbi Welch – Production coordination

Chart performance
Live at Montreux 1986 peaked at number two on the Portuguese Top 30 music DVD chart in late 2006. In Austria, the DVD release, reached his second best charting position, respectively peaking at number eight on the Ö3 Austria Top 10 music DVD chart in October 2006, where it stayed one week on chart. In the United Kingdom, the release positioned itself at rank 23 on the music DVD chart, compiled by the Official Charts Company. In the Netherlands, Live at Montreux 1986 reached number 26 on the MegaCharts compilation. In Germany, the DVD charted on the official Media Control albums chart at number 99. The release reached the year-end charts in Portugal on number 31, making it Eric Clapton's only DVD to reach the country's year-end chart. In Canada, New Zealand and the United States, the release was awarded a gold disc for outstanding sales. In Australia, the DVD was certified platinum to commemorate the nationwide sales. In total, the release sold more than 72,500 copies worldwide.

Chart positions

Weekly charts

Year-end charts

Certifications

References

External links
Live at Montreux 1986 – Credits at AllMusic

2006 video albums
2014 video albums
Eric Clapton video albums
Concert films
Eagle Rock Entertainment video albums
British musical films
2000s English-language films
2000s British films